The Shaanxi Y-9 is a medium military transport aircraft produced by Shaanxi Aircraft Company in China. It is a stretched and upgraded development of the Shaanxi Y-8F.

Development
Development of the Y-9 may have begun as early as 2002 as the Y-8X program. The program was a collaborative effort with Antonov – the designers of the An-12 that it was ultimately derived from – and was aimed at competing with the Lockheed Martin C-130J Super Hercules. By September 2005, the Y-9 designation was being used. The Y-9 received design features originally intended for the Y-8F600, which was cancelled in 2008.

Shaanxi had hoped to conduct the first flight as early as 2006, but it was delayed. Design changes were made in 2006, with the design being frozen by January 2010. After the design freeze, it was suggested that the first flight would depend on securing a launch customer; construction had also not yet commenced. The aircraft finally flew in November 2010.

The Y-9 entered People's Liberation Army Air Force (PLAAF) service in 2012, with full operating capability being announced in December 2017.

Design
The Y-9 is powered by four WoJiang WJ-6C turboprop engines. The propellers are six-bladed and made with Chinese JL-4 composites, and closely resemble the Dowty R406. The WJ-6C is replaced by the Pratt & Whitney Canada PW150B in the Y-9E export variant.

Cargo capacity 
The Y-9 is designed for 25 tons of cargo but can reportedly carry up to 30 tons. 

The aircraft can fit up to 106 passengers, 132 paratroopers, or 72 stretchers. For vehicles, it can carry two para-droppable ZBD-03 airborne combat vehicles as well as various other military equipment such as light trucks, cargo containers or pallets. 

The cargo bay has an internal volume of 155 m3 and is fitted with cargo handling rollers and tie-down rings. The rear entrance to the cargo bay also functions as a ramp.

Some special purpose variants such as the Y-9G (GX-11) have the rear ramp door removed.

Variants 
Y-9
Base variant
Y-9E
Export designation of Y-9
Y-9Q / KQ-200 (GX-6)
Anti-submarine aircraft
Y-9JB (GX-8)
Electronic intelligence variant
Y-9XZ (GX-9) 
Psychological warfare aircraft
Y-9W / KJ-500 (GX-10)
Airborne early warning and control variant. Five hour endurance, and fitted with lighter version of KJ-2000 AESA radar.
Y-9G (GX-11)
Electronic warfare (ECM) variant
Y-9X (GX-12)
Electronic intelligence (ELINT) aircraft

Operators 

 People's Liberation Army Air Force: Over 30 unit Y-9, 4 unit Y-9XZ, 8 unit Y-9W (KJ-500), 4 unit Y-9G, 2 unit Y-9X.
 People's Liberation Army Navy Air Force: 8 unit Y-9Q (KQ-200), 8 unit Y-9JZ (GX-8), 8 unit Y-9W (KJ-500H).
 People's Liberation Army Ground Force: 2

 Myanmar Air Force: 1 Y-9E (ordered November 2017)

Specifications (Y-9)

See also

References

Y-9
2000s Chinese military transport aircraft
Four-engined tractor aircraft
Four-engined turboprop aircraft
High-wing aircraft
Aircraft first flown in 2010